No. 658 Squadron was a Royal Air Force Air Observation Post squadron associated with the 21st Army Group during World War II. No.s 651 to 663 Squadrons of the RAF were Air Observation Post units working closely with Army units in artillery spotting and liaison. A further three of these squadrons, Nos. 664 to 666, were manned with Canadian personnel.

History

Formation and World War II
No. 658 Squadron was formed at RAF Old Sarum on 30 April 1943 with the Auster III and from March 1944 the Auster IV. The squadron role was to support the 21st Army Group and on 26 June 1944 it moved to France. Fighting in the break-out from Normandy it followed the army across the countries and into Germany. In October 1945 the squadron left for India, where it was disbanded on 15 October 1946.

The squadron number was transferred to the Army with the formation of the Army Air Corps (AAC) on 1 September 1957. No. 658 Squadron AAC uses the designation, badge and motto.

Aircraft operated

References

Notes

Bibliography

658 Squadron
Aircraft squadrons of the Royal Air Force in World War II
Military units and formations established in 1943
Military units and formations disestablished in 1946